The Hot Scots is a 1948 short subject directed by Edward Bernds starring American slapstick comedy team The Three Stooges (Moe Howard, Larry Fine and Shemp Howard). It is the 108th entry in the series released by Columbia Pictures starring the comedians, who released 190 shorts for the studio between 1934 and 1959.

Plot
The Stooges arrive in London and try to get jobs with Scotland Yard after graduating from a correspondence detective school. They end up as "Yard Men" picking up trash and pruning the hedges. They inadvertently get their chance to crack a case. Dressed in kilts and talking in phony Scottish accents, the Stooges (as McMoe, McLarry, and McShemp) travel north to Scotland and are given the task of guarding the prized possessions of The Earl of Glenheather Castle (Herbert Evans). The castle staff are actually ransacking the castle while the boys sleep there, though they eventually arrest the crooks led by the evil Lorna Doone (Christine McIntyre) who is the Earl's secretary. And while they were celebrating with a drink, they ran away from the castle after meeting a bagpipe-playing skeleton.

Production notes
The Hot Scots was the 11th Stooge film released but only the fourth one filmed after Shemp rejoined the comedy team. Filming took place on December 16–19, 1946, but was withheld from release until July 1948, 19 months later. It was remade in 1954 as Scotched in Scotland, using ample stock footage. In addition, the Scotland Yard scenes were reused in 1955's Hot Ice.

Like Squareheads of the Round Table and Fiddlers Three, The Hot Scots was filmed on the existing set of the feature film The Bandit of Sherwood Forest.

Christine McIntyre's character's name of Lorna Doone is taken from the title character of a romance/historical novel set in 17th century England. There is also a reference to the Nabisco shortbread cookies of the same name (Lorna offering cookies to Moe).

In popular culture
The Hot Scots was one of five Stooge shorts included in a 1995 airing of the TBS Halloween special The Three Stooges Fright Night along with Spooks (1953), If a Body Meets a Body (1945), We Want Our Mummy (1939), and Malice in the Palace (1949).

References

External links
 
 

1948 films
1948 comedy films
The Three Stooges films
American black-and-white films
Films directed by Edward Bernds
Films set in Scotland
Columbia Pictures short films
American comedy short films
1940s English-language films
1940s American films